Wainwright is a town in Muskogee County, Oklahoma, United States. The town was named for a local merchant, William Henry Wainwright. The population was 165 at the 2010 census, a decline of 16.2 percent from the figure of 197 recorded in 2000.

Geography
Wainwright is located at  (35.613426, -95.566116).

Demographics

As of the census of 2000, there were 197 people, 64 households, and 48 families residing in the town. There were 67 housing units at an average density of 229.0 per square mile (89.2/km2). The racial makeup of the town was 77.16% White, 5.08% African American, 15.23% Native American, 2.03% from other races, and 0.51% from two or more races. Hispanic or Latino of any race were 3.05% of the population.

There were 64 households, out of which 35.9% had children under the age of 18 living with them, 62.5% were married couples living together, 6.3% had a female householder with no husband present, and 25.0% were non-families. 20.3% of all households were made up of individuals, and 4.7% had someone living alone who was 65 years of age or older. The average household size was 3.08 and the average family size was 3.54.

In the town, the population was spread out, with 36.0% under the age of 18, 6.6% from 18 to 24, 31.0% from 25 to 44, 18.3% from 45 to 64, and 8.1% who were 65 years of age or older. The median age was 32 years. For every 100 females, there were 105.2 males. For every 100 females age 18 and over, there were 93.8 males.

The median income for a household in the town was $20,833, and the median income for a family was $14,861. Males had a median income of $21,250 versus $17,292 for females. The per capita income for the town was $7,639. About 27.5% of families and 31.4% of the population were below the poverty line, including 42.0% of those under the age of eighteen and none of those 65 or over.

References

Towns in Muskogee County, Oklahoma
Towns in Oklahoma